Capital City was a sternwheel steamboat of the Puget Sound Mosquito Fleet.  The vessel was originally named Dalton.

Career

Capital City was built in 1898 at Port Blakely at the Hall Brothers shipyard.  This vessel was originally owned by Canadian Pacific Ry. and was acquired by White Pass in 1901, but was not used under White Pass ownership.  The vessel was sold to S. Willey Steamship & Navigation Co. and renamed Capital City in 1901. The vessel was resold to McDonald Steamship Co. in 1903, resold to Olympia-Tacoma Navigation Co. in 1904, and resold again to Dallas, Portland & Astoria Navigation Co. in 1906. Broken up in 1919.  The vessel was originally named for John "Jack" Dalton (1856–1944), an Alaskan packer.

References
 Affleck, Edwin L, ed. A Century of Paddlewheelers in the Pacific Northwest, the Yukon, and Alaska, Alexander Nicholls Press, Vancouver, BC (2000) 
 Findlay, Jean Cammon and Paterson, Robin, Mosquito Fleet of Southern Puget Sound, (2008) Arcadia Publishing 

1898 ships
Steamboats of Washington (state)
Sternwheelers of Washington (state)
Passenger ships of the United States
Steamboats of the Yukon River